Tonic may refer to:
Tonic water, a drink traditionally containing quinine
Soft drink, a carbonated beverage
Tonic (physiology), the response of a muscle fiber or nerve ending typified by slow, continuous action
 Tonic syllable, the stressed syllable of a word
Herbal tonic, a herbal medicine with tonic effects
Tonic (music), a concept of music theory
Tonic (band), an American rock band
Tonic (Tonic album), 2010
Tonic (music venue), a New York City music venue, 1998–2007
Tonic (Medeski Martin & Wood album), 2000
Tonic (radio program), Canadian radio program
Tonic suit, a garment made from a shiny mohair blend that was fashionable among the Mods of the mid 1960s
Windtech Tonic, a Spanish paraglider design
Tonic (film), a Bengali film

See also 

Patent medicine that claims to have tonic properties
Tonči
Tonic sol-fa, a method of teaching sight-singing
Tonic Sol-fa (a cappella group), American singing group with a largely pop-music-oriented repertoire
Tonie, name
Tonio (name)